The Wiki Education Foundation (sometimes abbreviated Wiki Ed) is a 501(c)(3) nonprofit organization based in San Francisco, California. It runs the Wikipedia Education Program, which promotes the integration of Wikipedia into coursework by educators in Canada and the United States.

History
The Wikipedia Education Program was started by the Wikimedia Foundation in 2010. The Wiki Education Foundation incorporated in 2013, a process that the Wikimedia Foundation began in 2012 to give the education program "more focused and specialized support" and to "develop additional programs to promote academic research and teaching that engage with Wikipedia". It has been granted 501(c)(3) charity status.
 		 	
In February 2014, the Wikimedia Foundation (WMF) and Wiki Education Foundation announced the hiring of Frank Schulenburg, who had formerly served as senior director of programs at WMF, as the organization's first executive director. In April 2014, Schulenburg represented Wiki Ed at the World Literacy Summit in Oxford. The conference aims to make global improvements to literacy.

Leadership
Schulenburg has served as executive director since February 2014. Diana Strassmann heads its board of directors. Robert Cummings, director of the Center for Writing and Rhetoric and associate professor of English at the University of Mississippi, also serves on the board. Adrianne Wadewitz (1977–2014), a Wikipedian, had served on the board.

References

External links

 
 Wiki Education Foundation at Meta-Wiki
 Wikipedia Education Program, Diversifying Economic Quality: A Wiki for Instructors and Departments
 Experiences and Perspectives of Wikipedia Use in Higher Education  (PDF), Universitat Oberta de Catalunya (UOC)
"Editing Wikipedia Entries Is Becoming A Class Assignment In Colleges Across The U.S." 
"Wikis and Wikipedia as a teaching tool: Five years later", by Piotr Konieczny, (user:Piotrus), First Monday, September 3, 2012 (a detailed article about the project)

2013 establishments in California
501(c)(3) organizations
Non-profit organizations based in San Francisco
Organizations established in 2013
Wikipedia